The Elizabeth McCafferty Three-Decker was a historic triple decker house in Worcester, Massachusetts.  It was a fine example of a Queen Anne triple decker, with bands of decorative shingles and porch with turned posts.  It was built in 1894, and was listed on the National Register of Historic Places in 1990.  Its early tenants were primarily machinists and laborers, also including a policeman and teamster.  The building has apparently been demolished; the lot is now occupied by an auto shop.

See also
National Register of Historic Places listings in southwestern Worcester, Massachusetts
National Register of Historic Places listings in Worcester County, Massachusetts

References

Apartment buildings in Worcester, Massachusetts
Apartment buildings on the National Register of Historic Places in Massachusetts
Queen Anne architecture in Massachusetts
Houses completed in 1894
Triple-decker apartment houses
Demolished buildings and structures in Massachusetts
National Register of Historic Places in Worcester, Massachusetts